Raška is a geographical and historical region, covering the south-western parts of modern Serbia, and historically also including north-eastern parts of modern Montenegro, and some of the most eastern parts of modern Bosnia and Herzegovina. In the Middle Ages, the region was a center of the Serbian Principality and of the Serbian Kingdom, one central settlement of which was the city of Ras (a World Heritage Site) in the late 12th century. Its southern part corresponds to the region of Sandžak.

Name

The name is derived from the name of the region's most important fort of Ras, which first appears in the 6th century sources as Arsa, recorded under that name in the work De aedificiis of Byzantine historian Procopius. By the 10th century, the variant Ras became common name for the fort, as attested by the work De Administrando Imperio, written by Constantine Porphyrogenitus, and also by the Byzantine seal of John, governor of Ras (c. 971–976). 

In the same time, Ras became the seat of the Eastern Orthodox Eparchy of Ras, centered in the Church of the Holy Apostles Peter and Paul. The name of the eparchy eventually started to denote the entire area under its jurisdiction and later, thus becoming the common regional name.  

Under Stefan Nemanja (1166-1196), the fortress of Ras was re-generated as the state capital, and as such it became eponymous for the entire state. The first attested use of the term Raška ( or Rassia) as a designation for the Serbian state was made in a charter issued in Kotor in 1186, mentioning Stefan Nemanja as the ruler of Rascia.

History

Middle Ages

The 10th century De Administrando Imperio mentions Rasa (Stari Ras) as a border area between Bulgaria and Serbia at the end of the 9th century. Newer research indicates that the principal settlement of Ras in the late 9th century  was part of the First Bulgarian Empire. In 971, the Byzantine Catepanate of Ras was established, but in 976 Bulgarian control was restored. Basil II recaptured  it in 1016–1018. In the 1080s, the Raška region gradually became part of the state ruled by the Vojislavljević dynasty of Duklja and later a province of the newly formed Grand Principality of Serbia, under the Vukanović dynasty. Part of it remained a Byzantine frontier area until John II Komnenos lost the area as a result of the Byzantine–Hungarian War (1127–1129). Vukan, Grand Prince of Serbia may have taken Ras before 1112. Recent archaeological research supports the notion that the Byzantines held control of Ras during Alexios I Komnenos's reign (1048–1118), but possibly not continuously. In the time of Alexios, Ras was one of the northern border military strongholds which was fortified. His seal which dates to the period 1081–1092 was found in 2018 near the site. The Byzantine border fort of Ras was most likely burnt c. 1122 and this is probably the reason why John II Komnenos undertook a punitive campaign against the Serbs, during which many Serbs from the region of Raška were deported to Asia Minor. The alliance between Hungary and the Serbian rulers remained in place and Ras was burnt again by the Serbian army in 1127–1129. Its last commander was a Kritoplos who was then punished by the Emperor for the fall of the fortress. The town which had developed near the fortress of Ras and the territory which comprised its bishopric were the first significant administrative unit which Serb rulers acquired from the Byzantine Empire. As it was made the seat of the Serbian state in Latin sources of the era Serb rulers began to be named Rasciani and their state as Rascia. The name was used among Hungarians and Germans up until the nineteenth and twentieth centuries.  

In 1149, Manuel I Comnenus recovered the fortress of Ras. In the next decades, Serbian control in Ras was restored. The site was rebuilt in the 1160s and a palatial complex was erected. It became a royal residence of Stefan Nemanja, but it was not his permanent residence or that of his successors as the ruling dynasty also ruled over other such palatial centres in its territory. Byzantine intervention continued until the end of the 12th century and the Serb feudal rulers of the region were often under Byzantine suzerainty. The full independence of Raška was recognized by the Byzantines in 1190 after an indecisive war between Isaac II Angelos and Stefan Nemanja.

Timeline 
 9th century: Borderland between the Principality of Serbia (early medieval), the First Bulgarian Empire, the Byzantine Empire
 Catepanate of Ras (c 971–976/1016–1127) – Raška denotes the central part of the catepanate (Byzantine frontier province),
 First Bulgarian Empire (976–1016/18)
 Byzantine Empire (1016/18–1127), parts of the region remained Byzantine until 1127.
 Grand Principality of Duklja (1080–1101) – expanded in the region under Constantine Bodin.
 Serbian Grand Principality (1101–1217) – full Serbian control in the region is established after the capture of Stari Ras in 1127. Byzantine control was briefly reestablished in 1149.
 Serbian Grand Principality (1127–1217) – Raška is a central province, or a crownland. Full independence from the Byzantine Empire was recognized in 1190.
 Serbian Kingdom (1217–1345) – Raška is one of main provinces, or crownlands
 Serbian Empire (1345–1371) – Raška is one of the main inner provinces
 Serbian Despotate (15th century) – Raška is conquered by the Ottomans c. 1455

Modern
 

In 1833, some northern parts of the historical Raška region, up to the confluence of rivers Raška and Ibar, were detached from the Ottoman rule and incorporated into the Principality of Serbia. In order to mark the occasion, prince Miloš Obrenović (1815–1839) founded a new town, that was also called Raška, situated at the very confluence of Raška river and Ibar, right at the border with Ottoman territory.

In 1878, some southwestern parts of the historical Raška region, around modern Andrijevica, were liberated from the Ottoman rule and incorporated into the Principality of Montenegro. In order to mark the occasion, prince Nikola of Montenegro (1860–1918) decided to name the newly formed Eastern Orthodox diocese as the Eparchy of Zahumlje and Raška.

In 1912, central parts of the historical Raška region were liberated from the Ottoman rule, and divided between the Kingdom of Serbia and the Kingdom of Montenegro, with eponymous medieval fortress of Stari Ras belonging to Serbia.

Between 1918 and 1922, Raška District was one of the administrative units of the Kingdom of Serbs, Croats and Slovenes. Its seat was in Novi Pazar. In 1922, a new administrative unit known as the Raška Oblast was formed with its seat in Čačak. In 1929, this administrative unit was abolished and its territory was divided among three newly formed provinces (banovinas). The region is a part of the wider "Old Serbia" region, used in historical terms.

Within the borders of modern Serbia, historical Raška region covers (approximately) the territorial span of three districts: Raška, Zlatibor and Moravica.

Culture
Some of the churches in western Serbia and eastern Bosnia were built by masters from Raška, who belonged to the Raška architectural school. They include: Church of the Holy Apostles Peter and Paul in Stari Ras, and monasteries of Gradac and Stara Pavlica.

Geography

Sub-regions
 ("Old Vlach") is part of Priboj, Nova Varoš, Prijepolje, Užice, Čajetina, and Arilje, which is part of the Zlatibor District, and Ivanjica, which is part of Moravica District.
Pešter
South Podrinje
Raška River
Sjenica Field
Rujno
Zlatibor
Pljevlja Field
Nadibar
Dragačevo
Ibarski Kolašin

See also
List of regions of Serbia
Catepanate of Ras
Sandžak

References

Sources

External links

 Tourist Information About Raška region

Historical regions in Serbia
Geographical regions of Serbia
Geography of Šumadija and Western Serbia
History of Sandžak
Medieval Serbia
Subdivisions of Serbia in the Middle Ages
Serbia in the Early Middle Ages
Grand Principality of Serbia
Kingdom of Serbia (medieval)
Serbian Empire
Serbian Despotate
Medieval Montenegro